Mwandawiro Mghanga is a Kenyan politician, who serves as chairperson of the Communist Party of Kenya.

Mghanga was elected to the Kenyan National Assembly, representing the district of Wundanyi from 2002 to 2007.

Early life and education
As a Master's student at the University of Nairobi in 1980, Mghanga chaired the SONU. In this capacity he mobilized students against the de facto single-party Kenyan government. Mghanga was arrested and tortured by the Moi regime for alleged links to the Mwakenya resistance movement.

Following release, Mghanga took political refuge in Sweden where he completed graduate degrees at Stockholm University and the Swedish University of Agricultural Sciences.

References

Kenyan communists
Living people
Members of the National Assembly (Kenya)
Year of birth missing (living people)